Naledi (plural: dinaledi) means "star" in the Sotho-Tswana group of languages. It may refer to:

 Naledi Local Municipality, Free State, South Africa
 Naledi Local Municipality, North West, South Africa
 Naledi High School, in Soweto, South Africa
 Naledi Theatre Awards

See also
 Homo naledi, an extinct species of the genus Homo (humans)
 Naledi Pandor (born 1953), South African Minister of Science and Technology
 Theo Naledi (born 1936), retired Bishop of Botswana